Johnny Green (born 25 May 1967) is an English director of commercials and short films. In 2006 he made his directional debut directing the award winning Nasa film for Audi through BBH. Green has directed commercials for a number of companies including EA Sports, Land Rover, Adidas, Jean Paul Gaultier, Audi, Mercedes-Benz, Honda, Guinness, HTC, Firestone Tire  and Under Armour with Misty Copeland  In 2014 Green joined the commercial roster of Biscuit UK after directing Misty Copeland for Under Armour, a moving portrait with over eight million views online. Under Armour Misty Copeland was top 10 best ads of 2014 on adweek. Green’s work also includes a Nike World Cup commercial.

Green directed two films for Hennessy through Droga5 in the United States, one of which featured boxer Manny Pacquiao, and a campaign for Jean Paul Gaultier called On the  docks  starring Jarrod Scott and Riane Ten Haken.

Green is currently represented by Reset Content, Division Paris, and Insurrection.

Early life and education
Green, born in Manchester, England attended the Oundle boarding school in Northamptonshire and college at Saint Martin's School of Art in London. He is a graduate of Slade School of Fine Art where he earned a master's degree in theater design. Green worked as a stage manager for a London theater and later	 as an art department assistant in TV commercial production. He was later engaged in designing  small sets.

Career
Before his directorial debut in 2006, Green worked as a production designer for 12 years. In 2005 he read a story in a newspaper about two Mongolian brothers who had built motorbikes from spare parts and raced on ice tracks. He made a little documentary about these two brothers called Nyemka's Dream.
Nyemka's Dream earned him notice in advertising and marketing circles, leading to him directing Nasa, a short film for Audi through BBH and a number of other projects.  It grew from there…, Green said. 
In 2012, he joined Reset Content Academy Films, and is currently represented by Reset Content, Division Paris, and Insurrection. He worked with Gang films as a director for Jean-Paul Gaultier Perfume commercial.  
Green has directed campaigns featuring Neymar Jr for Nike (Nike Hypervenom Mirrors), welterweight champion Manny Pacquiao for Hennessy, Josh Brolin for Mercedes-Benz, Droga5 for NRG Energy  to Volvic in Immortal (won gold in 2015 cresta awards for special effects/computer graphics ), Guinness in Bring it to life, and fashion and fragrance films including on the docks for Jean Paul Gaultier, and some other campaigns.

Filmography

Commercials
 Nyemka's Dream
 Audi Nasa
 Sky Q
 HTC Blah Blah
 Sonos Rick Rubin
 Under Armour Misty Copeland
 Acura Bottle
 Nike Mirrors
 Hennessy Manny Pacquiao
 Audi Satellite
 Guinness Bring it to life
 Jean Paul Gaultier On the docks
 Mercedes Josh Brolin
 Volvic Immortal
 Honda Jump

References

External links
 "Reset Content" Contains films of his commercials and other videos
 "Division Paris" Contains films of his commercials and other videos
 "Insurrection" Contains films of his commercials and other videos

1967 births
Advertising directors
English film directors
Living people
Mass media people from Manchester